Bulevardul Magheru is a major street in central Bucharest. Built in the early 20th century, it is named after General Gheorghe Magheru. 

Together with Bulevardul Bălcescu, Magheru connects Piața Romană and Piața Universității squares and was in the 1930s and 1940s Bucharest's most modern part.  This is one of Europe and world's most representative modernist boulevards, where the architecture in vogue in the 1930s is prevalent. 

Part of the major thoroughfare than runs through the middle of Bucharest, it is continued to the south of C. A. Rosetti Street by Nicolae Bălcescu Boulevard and then by Ion C. Brătianu Boulevard, and toward the north by Lascăr Catargiu Boulevard and Șoseaua Kiseleff. 

Bulevardul Magheru is one of the most expensive shopping streets in Europe.

Notable buildings and structures 

Some notable buildings on Bulevardul Magheru are listed below, in the order in which they were built.

 , built in 1930
 Patria Cinema, housed in Horia Creangă's modernist 10-story ARO building, built in 1931
 Gas and Electricity Society Palace, built in 1935
 Scala Cinema, built in 1937 
 Casata building, built in 1938, destroyed during the 1977 earthquake, rebuilt after that
 , built in 1939
 , founded in 1947
 ITB building, built in 1959
 Eva building, built in 1961
 ONT building, built in 1961
 Piața Romană metro station, opened in 1988

The Dimitrie Sturdza House is just off the boulevard, on Arthur Verona Street.

See also
List of most expensive streets by city

Gallery

References

External links

 Magheru Boulevard on Flickr.com

Magheru
Historic monuments in Bucharest
Shopping districts and streets in Romania